"The Love Scene" is a song by American R&B singer Joe. It was written by Joe, Jolyon Skinner, and Michele Williams for his second studio album All That I Am (1997), while production was helmed by Joe and Edwin "Tony" Nicholas. Released as the album's third single, it reached number 22 on the UK Singles Chart and number 31 on the New Zealand Singles Chart, while peaking at number two on Billboards US Adult R&B Songs chart.

Track listings

Credits and personnel
 Monique Anderson – backing vocals
 Randy Bowland – guitar
 Roger Che – recording assistance
 Eric Gast – recording
 Peter Mokran – mastering
 Rodney Jerkins – mixing, producer, writer
 Edwin "Tony" Nicholas – producer
 Jolyon Skinner – writer
 Joe Thomas – producer, vocals, writer
 Michele Williams – writer

Charts

References

1997 singles
1997 songs
Joe (singer) songs
Jive Records singles
Songs written by Jolyon Skinner
Songs written by Joe (singer)
Songs written by Michele Williams